Gumnjani (Cyrillic: Гумњани) is a village in the municipality of Kostajnica, Republika Srpska, Bosnia and Herzegovina.

References

Populated places in Republika Srpska
Villages in Bosnia and Herzegovina